Funsho Ogundipe is a Nigerian pianist, music director and composer. Ogundipe is known for his work with the Afrobeat band Ayetoro . 
As musical director of Ayetoro, he is one of the primary architects of the post-Fela Kuti sound in Afrobeat

Musical Style

Ogundipe is one of the first post-Fela Kuti composers to attract attention for the sophistication of his work, which is influenced primarily by jazz and has  a wide and enchanting range of tonal colours.

His main Influences are Miles Davis, Duke Ellington and Fela Kuti.

References

Nigerian male musicians
Nigerian composers
Living people
Yoruba musicians
1968 births
Musicians from Lagos